FTMA offers a one-year film and television master of arts degree and a two-year film and television master's of fine arts program at Sacred Heart University in Fairfield, Connecticut.

History
The program first started accepting graduate students in the fall of 2013, becoming Connecticut's first graduate film school. Sacred Heart University's Graduate Center location is close to NBC Sports, ESPN and other film studios, and 30 miles from New York City.

FTMA's 2013 inaugural class was 23 students.

In 2019, FTMA moved its headquarters to an expanded facility on Sacred Heart University's West Campus in Fairfield, CT. Its new home features a sound stage, an editing lab classroom, post production facilities including color correction and sound mixing labs, and seminar and conference rooms.

Departments, programs and equipment
The Film and Television Master's program offers two-degree programs: a one-year master's of art program and a two-year master's of fine arts program, focusing on creating a conservatory-like atmosphere to teach the art of narrative storytelling, both traditional and in the new Internet-based media, as well as film theory. Students participate in workshops and create independent film, television and transmedia projects, and receive assistance and mentorship from faculty in developing professional relationships. The school's intention is for students to gain real-world experience through internships, industry mentorships and practical learning, leaving the program with a portfolio reflecting their individual goals.

The program offers advanced classes in film directing, producing, screenwriting, television production, commercial production and film theory courses. Equipment provided includes HD cameras, editing software (Adobe Premiere and Avid Media Composer) and other post-production software (including After Effects, Pro Tools and DaVinci color correction).

Classes are held in Sacred Heart University's West Campus location, which opened in December 2018. Stamford mayor Michael Pavia and Sacred Heart president John J. Petillo spoke at the opening.

Faculty
Faculty includes: Sundance film festival winner Todd Barnes, Student Oscar Finalist and accomplished director Zeke Hawkins, HBO and ABC staff writer Sharbari Ahmed, Director Myna Joseph, Screenwriter Roger S.H. Schulman, TV Producer Bill Harris, and film scholars Sally Ross, PhD and Sid Gottleib, PhD.

Notable guest lecturers include producers Michael Hausman (Amadeus, The People vs. Larry Flynt, Brokeback Mountain) and Jessica Caldwell (Electrick Children).

References

External links
 FTMA website

United States educational programs
Sacred Heart University
Master's degrees